The Jew Bill (more formally, "An Act to extend to the sect of people professing the Jewish religion, the same rights and privileges enjoyed by Christians") was passed in 1826 by the Maryland General Assembly to allow Jews to hold public office in the state.

The bill was passed on January 5, 1826, "after a long and arduous struggle." It altered the state's Test Act to allow Jews to hold public office upon swearing to a belief in "a future state of rewards and punishments;" previously, the state's constitution required public officeholders to make "a declaration of a belief in the Christian religion." The fight to pass it was led in the early 1820s by Jacob I. Cohen Jr. (1789–1869) and Solomon Etting (1764–1847), who subsequently ran successfully for Baltimore City Council and became the first Jews to hold elected office in Maryland. Maryland was among the last US states to remove a prohibition on Jews holding public office.

Arguing on behalf of the change, Thomas Kennedy, a Christian who had been elected to the Maryland legislature, said, "There are few Jews in the United States. In Maryland there are very few. But if there was only one — to that one, we ought to do justice."

References

Jews and Judaism in Maryland
Legal history of Maryland
Jewish political status
1826 in American law
Freedom of religion in the United States
1826 in Maryland
Jewish-American history